This is the De/Vision discography.

Studio albums

Singles

References

Discographies of German artists